Maksim Yuryevich Rudnev (born 20 April 1997) is a Russian football player who plays as a centre forward for FC Chelyabinsk.

Club career
He made his debut in the Russian Football National League for FC Yenisey Krasnoyarsk on 12 March 2016 in a game against FC Baikal Irkutsk.

References

External links
 Profile by Russian Football National League

1997 births
People from Khakassia
Living people
Russian footballers
FC Yenisey Krasnoyarsk players
Association football forwards
FC Zenit-Izhevsk players
Sportspeople from Khakassia